The 1946–47 English National League season was the sixth season of the English National League, the top level ice hockey league in England. Seven teams participated in the league, and the Brighton Tigers won the championship.

Regular season

External links
 Season on hockeydb.com

Eng
Engl
Engl
English National League seasons
1946–47 in British ice hockey